In enzymology, a polysaccharide O-methyltransferase is an enzyme that catalyzes the chemical reaction

S-adenosyl-L-methionine + 1,4-alpha-D-glucooligosaccharide  S-adenosyl-L-homocysteine + oligosaccharide containing 6-methyl-D-glucose units

Thus, the two substrates of this enzyme are S-adenosyl methionine and 1,4-alpha-D-glucooligosaccharide, whereas its two products are S-adenosylhomocysteine and oligosaccharide containing 6-methyl-D-glucose units.

This enzyme belongs to the family of transferases, specifically those transferring one-carbon group methyltransferases.  The systematic name of this enzyme class is S-adenosyl-L-methionine:1,4-alpha-D-glucan 6-O-methyltransferase. Other names in common use include polysaccharide methyltransferase, and acylpolysacharide 6-methyltransferase.

References

Gene ontology (GO) codes

EC 2.1.1
Enzymes of unknown structure